The 2015 season is Western New York Flash's eighth season of existence, and the third in which they competed in the National Women's Soccer League, the top division of women's soccer in the United States.

First-team squad

Match results

Pre-season

Regular season

Standings

Results summary

Results by round

Squad statistics
Source: NWSL

Key to positions: FW – Forward, MF – Midfielder, DF – Defender, GK – Goalkeeper

See also
 2015 National Women's Soccer League season

References

External links 
 

Western New York Flash seasons
Western New York Flash
Western New York Flash
Western New York Flash